The 1996–97 Courage League National Division Three was the tenth full season of rugby union within the third tier of the English league system, currently known as National League 1. Exeter won a title for the second season in succession, following  last seasons National League 4 title. The runner-up, Fylde, finished one point behind Exeter and were also promoted. Four teams were relegated; Walsall to National 2 North and Havant, Redruth and Clifton to National 2 South.

Structure
The league consists of sixteen teams, playing each other on a home and away basis to make a total of thirty matches for each team. There are two promotion places and four relegation places, with the champions and runner-up promoted to National League 2 and the last four teams relegated to either National Division 4 North or South, depending on their location.

Participating teams and locations 

National Division Three was increased from ten teams to sixteen with six of the clubs participating in last seasons competition. To make up the numbers the top eight teams in National Division Four were all promoted; Lydney and Wharfedale, as champions of National League 5 South and National League 5 North respectively were also promoted, from the fifth to the third tier.

League table

Sponsorship
National Division Three is part of the Courage Clubs Championship and is sponsored by Courage Brewery. This was their tenth and final season of sponsorship.

See also
 English Rugby Union Leagues
 English rugby union system
 Rugby union in England

References

N3
National League 1 seasons